Alexis Mang-Ikri Wangmene (born March 1, 1989) is a Cameroonian professional basketball player who plays for FAP of the Basketball Africa League (BAL). He played college basketball for the Texas Longhorns and has represented the Cameroon national team.

Early life
Wangmene was spotted by San Antonio Spurs general manager R. C. Buford at a Basketball Without Borders camp in his native Cameroon. Buford and his wife brought Wangmene to the United States and resettled him in San Antonio, where he played basketball and attended Central Catholic Marianist High School for two years. During his junior year at Central, the power forward was named to the TAPPS 6A All-State team. Following his junior year, Wangmene transferred to Blair Academy in New Jersey, from which he graduated in 2007.

College career
At Texas, Wangmene missed all but four games of his sophomore year with a knee injury. In May 2009, he received a medical redshirt because of the injury and had three years of eligibility remaining prior to the 2009–10 season.

Professional career
After going undrafted in the 2012 NBA draft, Wangmene joined the San Antonio Spurs for the 2012 NBA Summer League. On November 2, 2012, he was selected by the Austin Toros in the fifth round of the 2012 NBA Development League Draft. In July 2013, he re-joined the San Antonio Spurs for the 2013 NBA Summer League.

In October 2013, Wangmene signed with Slovenian team Hopsi Polzela for the 2013–14 season.

In June 2014, Wangmene signed a two-year deal with fellow Slovenian team Krka Novo Mesto. He was released by Krka in July 2015 following the 2014–15 season.

In November 2015, Wangmene with Polish team Stal Ostrów Wielkopolski.

On October 30, 2016, Wangmene was selected by the Austin Spurs in the sixth round of the 2016 NBA Development League Draft.

Wangmene signed a contract with Limburg United of the Belgian league on January 29, 2020.

On October 23, 2021, Wangmene was selected by the Austin Spurs in the second round of the 2021 NBA G League Draft with their 39th overall pick. He was then later waived on January 31, 2022.

In April 2022, Wangmene was revealed to be on the roster of Cameroon's FAP roster for the 2022 BAL season.

References

External links
Texas Longhorns bio
NBA D-League profile

1989 births
Living people
ABA League players
Austin Spurs players
Austin Toros players
Limburg United players
Basketball players from Yaoundé
Blair Academy alumni
Cameroonian men's basketball players
Cameroonian expatriate basketball people in the United States
Cameroonian expatriate basketball people in France
Cameroonian expatriate basketball people in Poland
Cameroonian expatriate basketball people in Belgium
KK Krka players
Power forwards (basketball)
Texas Longhorns men's basketball players
Saint-Quentin Basket-Ball players
KB Ylli players
Cameroonian expatriate basketball people in Slovenia
Cameroonian expatriate basketball people in Kosovo